Mikhail Nikolayevich Pokrovsky (– April 10, 1932) was a Russian Marxist historian, Bolshevik revolutionary and a public and political figure. One of the earliest professionally trained historians to join the Russian revolutionary movement, Pokrovsky is regarded as the most influential Soviet historian of the 1920s and was known as “the head of the Marxist historical school in the USSR”.

Pokrovsky was neither a Bolshevik nor a Menshevik for nearly a decade prior to the October Revolution of 1917, instead living in European exile as an independent radical close to philosopher Alexander Bogdanov. Following the Bolshevik seizure of power, Pokrovsky rejoined the Bolshevik Party and moved to Moscow, where he became the deputy chief of the Soviet government's new department of education, the People's Commissariat of Enlightenment.

Pokrovsky played a leading role in the early Soviet educational establishment, editing several of the major historical journals of the period, and guiding the restructuring of the higher education system and its personnel as head of the Institute of Red Professors. He was also the author of influential and pioneering works of Russian history, presenting semi-official reinterpretations of the Russian past presented through the lens of class struggle and the progress of history through concrete stages of development. Pokrovsky was harshly critical of the nature of the multi-national Tsarist empire and deemphasized the personal role played by individuals such as the modernizing Tsar Peter the Great.

Biography

Early years

Mikhail Pokrovsky was born August 29, 1868 in Moscow into the family of a state official who had gained hereditary nobility from the Tsar. He was well educated as a boy, completing work at a classical gymnasium before enrolling in the History Department of Moscow University at the age of 19, where he studied under Vasily Klyuchevsky and Paul Vinogradov, two of the most renowned historians of the era. He would graduate from that institution in 1891, going on to pursue a Master's degree with Klyuchevsky; this work was not completed due to personal differences.

Undeterred by his lack of an advanced academic degree, Pokrovsky began teaching in secondary schools and university extension programs, pursuing his ambition of becoming a professional historian. He did not gain a university teaching position, however, instead being forced to settle for teaching history courses in secondary schools, evening extension courses, and non-university courses for women. A young man of progressive sympathies, Pokrovsky was finally prohibited from giving public lectures in 1902 owing to his radical views.

Specifics of Pokrovsky's early political activity are sparse, with Pokrovsky himself acknowledging many years after the fact that he had participated in the Union of Liberation, a middle class organization seeking the establishment of a constitution for Russia that was a forerunner of the Constitutional-Democratic Party (Cadets).

From 1905 to 1917

Pokrovsky became a Marxist during the Russian Revolution of 1905, joining the Bolshevik Party. He was invited by party leader V.I. Ulianov (Lenin) to contribute to the party's official newspaper published in exile, Proletarii (The Proletarian).

Inside the Bolshevik organization, Pokrovsky was close to the radical faction surrounding Alexander Bogdanov, the Vpered (Forward) group. Other key members of this faction included future Bolshevik education chief Anatoly Lunacharsky and prominent writer Maxim Gorky.

The failure of the 1905 revolution caused Pokrovsky to emigrate, first to Finland, before making his way to France in 1908. Pokrovsky would remain in French exile until the coming of the October Revolution in 1917. It was in French exile that Pokrovsky wrote his first major historiographic work, The History of Russia from Earliest Times, published in five volumes from 1910 to 1913.

Bogdanov and the Vperedists established a Marxist party school on the Italian island of Capri early in 1909, with a view to educating and training ordinary working class Russians as future party leaders, intending the project to be open to adherents of the Bolshevik and Menshevik organizations alike. Pokrovsky was called upon as a party academic to lecture at the Capri school on the topic of Russian history. 

The Vperedists in exile established a second Russian party school in Bologna, Italy from 1910 to 1911, again seeking participation from both Bolshevik and Menshevik wings of the Russian Social Democratic Labor Party. Pokrovsky again participated in this project as a history lecturer, being joined by Lunacharsky, Bogdanov, and others. Chief factional leaders Lenin and Georgy Plekhanov were hostile to the project, however, and the Bologna school — and with it the Vpered group itself — subsequently disintegrated.

After Bogdanov's expulsion from the Bolshevik fraction within the Russian Social Democratic Labor Party in 1909, Pokrovsky followed him out of that organization. He would remain a non-Bolshevik radical until the revolutionary year of 1917, when he returned to Russia in August 1917, following the February Revolution, which overthrew Tsar Nicholas II. Pokrovsky's relentless attack on the Tsarist old regime as a "prison of peoples" and "international gendarme" was henceforth deemed to be anti-patriotic "national nihilism" and a new Russian nationalist historical orthodoxy was established. This new official orthodoxy remained in place for the duration of Stalin's life.

Pokrovsky's life's work was comprehensively trashed in two collections of essays, Against the Historical Conceptions of M.N.Pokrovsky and Against the Anti-Marxist Conceptions of M.N.Pokrovsky, published in 1939 and 1940 respectively, when the new school of history honoured past military heroes and emphasised the positive effects of the spread of Russian rule. In the 1939 volume, Anna Pankratova, who was emerging as one of the authoritative Stalinist historians, wrote that:

In 1942, during the war with Germany, another volume, Twenty Five Years of Historical Scholarship in the USSR, one of the contributors summarised what Pokrovsky had allegedly got wrong: 

Only after the Soviet leader's death and the subsequent renunciation of his policies by the Communist Party did Pokrovsky's work regain some influence among academic historians in the USSR. Although regarded as a rigid Marxist polemicist by his critics, Pokrovsky is also acknowledged as a "conscientious scholar who would not sacrifice intellectual honesty to the demands of propaganda" by others, leaving his an ambiguous legacy.

See also
Soviet historiography
World-systems theory

Footnotes

Works

 7 let proletarskoi diktatury (7 years of proletarian dictatorship). Moscow: Gosudarstvennoe Izdatel'stvo, n.d. (1924).
 History of Russia From the Earliest Times to the Rise of Commercial Capitalism. D.S. Mirsky, trans. New York: International Publishers, 1931.
 Brief History of Russia, Volume II. D.S. Mirsky, trans. New York: International Publishers, 1933.
 Izbrannye proizvedeniia v chetyrekh knigakh (Selected Works in four volumes). Moscow: Mysl, 1966.
 Russia in World History: Selected Essays. Roman Szporluk and Mary Ann Szporluk, ed. and trans. Ann Arbor, MI: University of Michigan Press, 1970.

Further reading

 John F. Barber, Soviet Historians in Crisis, 1928-1932. London: Palgrave Macmillan, 1981.
 David Brandenberger, "Politics Projected into the Past: What Precipitated the Anti-Pokrovskii Campaign?" in Ian D. Thatcher (ed.), Reinterpreting Revolutionary Russia: Essays in Honour of James D. White. Houndmills, England: Palgrave, 2006; pp. 202–214.
 David Brandenberger, "Who Killed Pokrovsky (the Second Time)? The Prelude to the Denunciation of the Father of Soviet Marxist Historiography, January 1936," Revolutionary Russia, vol. 11, no. 1 (1998), pp. 67–73.
 D.Dorotich, Disgrace and Rehabilitation of M.N.Pokrovsky, Canadian Slavonic Papers, v.8 (1966), pp. 169 - 181
 Bernard W. Eissenstat, "M.N. Pokrovsky and Soviet Historiography: Some Reconsiderations," Slavic Review, vol. 28, no. 4 (Dec. 1969), pp. 604–618. In JSTOR
 George M. Enteen, "Soviet Historians Review their Own Past: The Rehabilitation of M.N. Pokrovsky," Soviet Studies, vol. 20, no. 3 (1969).
 George M. Enteen, The Soviet Scholar Bureaucrat: M.N. Pokrovskii and the Society of Marxist Historians. University Park, PA: Pennsylvania State University Press, 1978.
 Jonathan Frankel, "Party Genealogy and the Soviet Historians (1920-1938)," Slavic Review, vol. 25, no. 4 (Dec. 1966), pp. 563–603. In JSTOR
 Boris Dmitrievich Grekov, Против исторической концепции М.Н. Покровского; сборник статей. (Against the Historical Conceptions of M.N. Pokrovsky: Collection of Articles). In two volumes. Moscow: Izdatel'stvo Akademii nauk SSSR, 1939-1940.
 John Keep, "The Rehabilitation of M.N. Pokrovskii," Power and the People: Essays on Russian History. Boulder, CO: Eastern European Monographs, 1995; pp. 383-404.
 Alexandr Mazour, Modern Russian Historiography. Princeton, NJ: D. Van Nostrand Company, 1958.
 M.V. Nechkina, "Vopros o M.N. Pokrovskom v postanovleniiakh partii i pravitel'stva 1934-1938 gg." (The question of M.N. Pokrovsky in the regulations of the party and government 1934-1938), Istoricheskie zapiskie, no. 118 (1990), pp. 232–246.
 Konstantin Shteppa. Russian Historians and the Soviet State. New Brunswick, NJ: Rutgers University Press, 1962.
 Oleg Dmitrievich Sokolov, М.Н. Покровский и советская историческая наука (M.N. Pokorovsky and Soviet Historical Science). Moscow: Misl', 1970.
 Roman Szpoluk, "Pokrovsky and Russian History," Survey, October 1964.

External links
 Boris Kagarlitsky - Разгадка сфинкса Забытая история Михаила Покровского 

1868 births
1932 deaths
Chairpersons of the Executive Committee of Mossovet
Communist Party of the Soviet Union members
Russian Marxist historians
Moscow State University alumni
Old Bolsheviks
Burials at the Kremlin Wall Necropolis
Russian communists
Russian Social Democratic Labour Party members
Russian socialists
Russian Marxists
20th-century Russian historians
Full Members of the USSR Academy of Sciences
Russian Constituent Assembly members
Soviet Marxist historians